KylieFever2002 is the 2002 live DVD by Kylie Minogue, recorded at the Manchester Arena in Manchester, England, on 4 May 2002 during the KylieFever2002 concert tour. The DVD contains the full two-hour concert, a 30-minute behind-the-scenes documentary, live projections of the songs "Cowboy Style", "Light Years" / "I Feel Love", "I Should Be So Lucky", and "Burning Up", and a photo-gallery. A limited edition version was also released, with different packaging and a bonus CD with highlights from the KylieFever2002 concert. KylieFever2002 reached No. 16 on U.S. Billboard's Top Music Video chart.

Track listing

Note
 "I Should Be So Lucky" is listed on releases as "Lucky".

Certifications

|-

|-

|-

References

2002 video albums
2002 live albums
Kylie Minogue video albums
Kylie Minogue live albums
Live video albums